Kharam or Kherem may refer to:
 Kharam (tribe), in India
 Kherem, Mazandaran
 Kharam, Khusf, South Khorasan Province

See also
 Khorram (disambiguation)